Dicta License is a Filipino band formed December 1999, whose music is a fusion of rock, rap, and grunge. This band consists of Pochoy Labog on vocals, Bryan Makasiar on drums, Kelley Mangahas on bass, and Boogie Romero on guitars.

The band's name literally translates as "License to Speak,"  which can be aptly associated with the philosophical cum socio-political tone evident in their songs. The band's influences include Rage Against the Machine, Lauryn Hill, The Roots, Public Enemy, Incubus, and many others, with RATM being their strongest influence of all.

Break
Their first big break happened in 2001 when Warner Music Philippines included their songs Duct Tape and Criminal in its compilation album, No Seat Affair, together with other than up-and-coming artists, Cog, DTS, Zooom, Six Digit and Euglito's Eye. In that same year, the band was invited to the Busan International Rock Festival in Korea, where they performed in front of a crowd of about 25,000.

Career 
In 2003, they released a 5-song EP which consisted of their original songs Burning Streets of Love and Hate, Criminal, Smoke Under the Table, Falling Earth and Undiscarded. Two years after, the band released their first album, Paghilom, under Warner Music Philippines released on September 21, 2005. It consisted of ten tracks with lyrics that explicitly address the Filipino youth with issues of socio-political concern. Their carrier single from this album, "Ang Ating Araw" was the most played song on NU 107 for the year 2005. On April 9, 2021, the band released their 2nd album "Pagbigkas" on digital release. and a Limited Edition and numbered pressing Vinyl of the album was released on May 25, 2022.

Achievements
Band recognitions include nominations from MTV Pilipinas Video Music Awards 2006 for Best Cinematography in a Video and Best Production Design in a Video for their song, "Complex." They've also had individual recognitions like in the NU 107 Rock Awards 2006, where Pochoy Labog was nominated for Vocalist of the Year and Best Male, and Boogie for Guitarist of the Year. The band was also nominated for the Rising Sun award.

Dicta License also collaborated with Urbandub to do the theme song for the 2006 MTV Music Summit for HIV/AIDS, which was held December 2006 at The Fort Open Grounds.

Collaborations 
Kami nAPO Muna Ulit (Universal Records, 2007)

Awards and nominations

References

The Intense Rock Band by Aprylle Liabres
Revolution Rock: Dicta License Lights a Fire by Lawrence Dominguez Casiraya
Dicta License: Undiscarded by "lunchbox"

External links
 Dicta License on Cereal Cyanide
 Dicta License on MySpace

Filipino rock music groups
Musical groups from Quezon City
Musical groups established in 1999
1999 establishments in the Philippines
Warner Music Philippines artists